Subconscious-Lee is a jazz album by Lee Konitz although  a few tracks were issued on 78rpm under Lennie Tristano's name. It was recorded in 1949 and 1950, and released on the Prestige label (originally as PRLP 7004 in 12" LP format in 1955 as follows in the OJC reissue).

Track listing
 "Progression" (Konitz) – 3:00
 "Tautology" (Konitz) – 2:45
 "Retrospection" (Lennie Tristano) – 3:09
 "Subconscious-Lee" (Konitz) – 2:49
 "Judy" (Tristano) – 2:56
 "Marshmallow" (Warne Marsh) – 2:55
 "Fishin' Around" (Marsh) – 3:47
 "Tautology" (Konitz) – 2:56
 "Sound-Lee" (Konitz) – 4:08
 "Rebecca" (Konitz) – 3:05
 "You Go to My Head" (J. Fred Coots, Haven Gillespie) – 2:38
 "Ice Cream Konitz" (Konitz) – 2:45
 "Palo Alto" (Konitz) – 2:31

Recorded in New York City January 11, 1949 (1-5), June 28, 1949 (6, 7), September 27, 1949 (8, 9) and April 7, 1950 (10-13)

Personnel 
 Lee Konitz – alto saxophone 
 Warne Marsh – tenor saxophone (6-9)
 Billy Bauer – guitar (1-5, 10-13)
 Lennie Tristano – piano (1-5)
 Sal Mosca - piano (6-13)
 Arnold Fishkin – bass 
 Shelly Manne – drums (1, 2, 4)
 Denzil Best - drums (6, 7)
 Jeff Morton - drums (8-13)

References

Lee Konitz albums
Prestige Records albums